Nothomorpha is a genus of beetles in the family Buprestidae, containing the following species:

 Nothomorpha latifrons Holm, 1976
 Nothomorpha major Kerremans, 1899
 Nothomorpha minima Kerremans, 1899
 Nothomorpha pauperata Thomson, 1878
 Nothomorpha rudis (Wiedemann, 1821)
 Nothomorpha rugosa (Thunberg, 1787)
 Nothomorpha verrucosa (Gory & Laporte, 1839)

References

Buprestidae genera